Delphi Community High School is a public secondary school located in Delphi, Indiana. The school serves more than 500 students in grades 9 to 12 in the Delphi Community School Corporation district.  The students of Delphi Community School Corporation reside in the cities of Delphi and Camden, as well as in the townships of Deer Creek, Madison, Jackson, Liberty, Rock Creek, and Tippecanoe.

Athletics
Delphi Community High School competes in the Hoosier Athletic Conference. The school mascot is the Oracle and the school colors are black and gold.

Fall

Varsity Soccer
Varsity Football
Boys/Girls Cross Country
Varsity Boys Tennis
Varsity Girls Volleyball
Varsity Cheerleading

Winter
Girls Varsity Basketball
Boys Varsity Basketball
Boys Varsity Wrestling 
Boys/Girls Varsity Swimming

Spring
Varsity Baseball
Varsity Golf
Varsity Boys/Girls Track
Varsity Girls Tennis
Varsity Girls Softball

Clubs
FFA
National Honor Society
Class Officers
Fellowship of Christian Athletes
Chess Club
French Club
Spanish Club

Notable alumni
Amanda Overmyer – American Idol (season 7) contestant
Dick the Bruiser – former professional wrestler
Doxie Moore – former professional basketball player for the Sheboygan Red Skins, Anderson Packers and the Milwaukee Hawks

See also
 List of high schools in Indiana
 Hoosier Athletic Conference
 Delphi, Indiana

References

External links
 Official website

Public high schools in Indiana
Schools in Carroll County, Indiana
Delphi, Indiana